Kamakhyaguri is a census town and business destination  in the Kumargram CD block in the Alipurduar subdivision of the Alipurduar district in the Indian state of West Bengal. There are Railway Park, Mini Indoor Stadium, Rasikbill mini Zoo, Chipra Forest etc.

Geography

Location

It is situated beside the 31C national highway.
Kamakhyaguri situated between the river Rydak1 and Raydak2.

Physiography of Kamakhyaguri: It is part of Doors region. The type of soil is partly Alluvium in nature. 
Temperature : Maximum 35-38 degree Celsius in Summer and Minimum 8-10 degree Celsius in Winter.

Area overview
Alipurduar district is covered by two maps. It is an extensive area in the eastern end of the Dooars in West Bengal. It is undulating country, largely forested, with numerous rivers flowing down from the outer ranges of the Himalayas in Bhutan. It is a predominantly rural area with 79.38% of the population living in the rural areas. The district has 1 municipal town and 20 census towns and that means that 20.62% of the population lives in the urban areas. The scheduled castes and scheduled tribes, taken together, form more than half the population in all the six community development blocks in the district. There is a high concentration of tribal people (scheduled tribes) in the three northern blocks of the district.

Note: The map alongside presents some of the notable locations in the subdivision. All places marked in the map are linked in the larger full screen map.

Demographics
 India census, Uttar Kamakhyaguri is a census town in the district of Alipurduar , West Bengal. The Uttar Kamakhyaguri census town has population of 12,022 of which 6,132 are males while 5,890 are females as per the report released by Census India 2011.

The population of children ages 0–6 is 1006 which is 8.37% of the total population of Uttar Kamakhyaguri (CT). In Uttar Kamakhyaguri Census Town, female sex ratio is of 961 against state average of 950. Moreover child sex ratio in Uttar Kamakhyaguri is around 992 compared to West Bengal state average of 956. The literacy rate of Uttar Kamakhyaguri city is 91.81% higher than state average of 76.26%. In Uttar Kamakhyaguri, male literacy is around 94.63% while female literacy rate is 88.87%.

Uttar Kamakhyaguri Census Town has total administration over 2,826 houses to which it supplies basic amenities like water and sewerage. It is authorized to build roads in Census Town limits and impose taxes on properties coming under its jurisdiction.

Markets like Ghoramara Market, Tetultola Market, Sadhan Chawpathi Market, Debenbabu Chawpathi Market, Kamakhyaguri Supermarket, Old Market present.

College 
1.Sahid Kshudiram Mahavidyalaya is the only degree College of Kumargram Block situated in  Kamakhyaguri. Three streams Science, Arts and Commerce are offered here for graduation.

2.Sister Nivedita B.Ed College 

3.Alipurduar Engineering College is also situated near kamakhyaguri

School
Kamakhyaguri High School and

Kamakhyaguri Girls High School

Kamakhyaguri Mission High School

Sister Nivedita Convent School

Ananda Marga English Medium School

Eternal Light English Medium School

Shri Arabinda Shishu Tirtha

Sarda Sishu tirtha

Oxford School

Swami Vivekananda Academi
Birpara Sishu Niketon

Healthcare
Kamakhyaguri Rural Hospital, with 30 beds at Kamakhyaguri, is the major government medical facility in the Kumargram CD block. Block Animal Health Centre situate near Tetultala Chawpathi beside 31-C

Transport
Kamakhyaguri Railway Station serves kamakhyaguri town which lies in New Jalpaiguri–New Bongaigaon section of Barauni–Guwahati line of Northeast Frontier Railway also The station lies on Alipurduar railway division.

References

Cities and towns in Alipurduar district